The  was a Bo-Bo wheel arrangement electric locomotive type operated by private railway operator Nagoya Railroad (Meitetsu) in Japan from 1943 until 2015.

Operations
Originally used to haul freight trains, they were later used primarily on track maintenance trains and rolling stock transfer duties. , all four locomotives were still in service, but the locomotives were withdrawn and cut up during fiscal 2015 following the introduction of new Class EL120 locomotives. Locomotives 601 and 602 were normally based at Inuyama Depot, and 603 and 604 were normally based at Shinkawa Depot.

History
The four locomotives were built by Toshiba between 1943 and 1945.

Locomotives DeKi 603 and 604 were originally built as locomotive numbers E401 and E402 for use on the Japanese-occupied island of Hainan during World War II, but were ultimately not able to be shipped abroad, and were instead purchased by Meitetsu.

Originally painted in black with yellow and black chevrons at the ends, the locomotives were repainted into "Meitetsu Blue" when they underwent life extension refurbishment in 1992.

All four locomotives were withdrawn in July 2015, and cut up.

References

1067 mm gauge locomotives of Japan
Electric locomotives of Japan
Toshiba locomotives
1500 V DC locomotives
DeKi 600
Railway locomotives introduced in 1943
Bo-Bo locomotives
Scrapped locomotives
Steeplecab locomotives